The women's singles SU5 tournament at the 2020 Summer Paralympics in Tokyo took place between 1 and 4 September 2021 at Yoyogi National Gymnasium.

Format 
10 Players entered the competition, They were divided in 3 Groups(A,B,C). Best 2 group winners got byes to semifinals and the rest group winner and runners up competed in Quarter-finals for 2 semi-finals berths.

Seeds 
These were the seeds for this event:
 (silver medalist)
 (gold medalist)
 (group stage)

Group stage 
The draw of the group stage revealed on 26 August 2021. The group stage was played from 1 to 3 September. The top two winners of each group advanced to the knockout rounds.

Group A

Group B

Group C

Finals 
The knockout stage was played from 3 to 4 September.

References 

Badminton at the 2020 Summer Paralympics